The Dutchess County Public Transit is the bus service provided by the Dutchess County Division of Public Transit in Dutchess County, New York. Dutchess County Public Transit provides a variety of bus services throughout Dutchess County ranging from fixed-route services, centered primarily along the Route 9 corridor, rail shuttles to/from Hudson Line stations, and demand response/deviated flex services.

LOOP (the previous name), and the Division of Public Transit, was created in the early-1970s as the assumption of a variety of private line runs that had served various parts of the county.

Routes
Dutchess County Public Transit provides service along 6 routes in a hub-and-spoke system from Poughkeepsie. In the past, routes ran to the far northeastern reaches of the county (to North East and Pine Plains), but these routes have been removed from the service area because of lack of ridership.

Regular routes
All routes operate Monday-Saturday unless otherwise noted. Routes A, B, F, and H are the only ones that operate Sunday.
The one-way fare is $1.75. Transfers are only available to/from routes within the City of Poughkeepsie for 30 cents.

Poughkeepsie note: Unless otherwise noted, outbound buses originate at the Poughkeepsie Transit Hub near the Mid-Hudson Civic Center (Main & Market), then operate to the Metro-North/Amtrak station, then to their respective destinations.  Westbound buses stop at the Poughkeepsie Transit Hub, then operate to the Metro-North station where they terminate.

RailLink shuttles 
These routes operate weekday rush hours only, to and from their namesake Metro-North station.

See also 
 City of Poughkeepsie Transit, the former provider of bus service in the City of Poughkeepsie
 Putnam Transit (PT), the system serving Putnam County connecting with Dutchess County Public Transit in Beacon on the weekends with a trolley service
 Ulster County Area Transit (UCAT), a similar system in Ulster County connecting with Dutchess County Public Transit in Poughkeepsie

Fleet

Active roster

Retired roster
This roster is incomplete.

References

External links 
 Dutchess County Division of Mass Transit Homepage

Surface transportation in Greater New York
Bus transportation in New York (state)
Transportation in Dutchess County, New York